The Del Mar Union School District (DMUSD) is a public school district based in Del Mar in San Diego County, California. The district was founded in 1906.  For many years, the district was small, serving approximately 1,000 students in the City of Del Mar.  However, in the 1990s, the district's boundaries were expanded to include the newly developed Carmel Valley subdivision in the City of San Diego.  Today, approximately 4,000 children attend the district's eight schools.

Academics
The district is well regarded for its high standardized test scores. In 2006, the district scored 939 on the Academic Performance Index, higher than any other district in San Diego County.  This top-ranking was repeated in 2007.  Individually, Sage Canyon School has posted the highest Base APIs scores in the County from 2004 to 2008.

Schools
The district consists of eight K-6 schools:

Ashley Falls School
Carmel Del Mar School
Del Mar Heights School
Del Mar Hills Academy
Ocean Air School

Sycamore Ridge Elementary School
Torrey Hills School
Pacific Sky School

Together with the schools in the Solana Beach School District, the Del Mar Union elementary schools generally feed into Carmel Valley Middle School and onto either Torrey Pines High School or Canyon Crest Academy, all part of the San Dieguito Union High School District.

References

External links
 Del Mar Union School District website

School districts in San Diego County, California
Education in San Diego
School districts established in 1906
1906 establishments in California